The Tabarestan riffle minnow (Alburnoides tabarestanensis) is a species of freshwater fish in the family Cyprinidae. It is endemic to the Tajan River drainage in Iran.

References 

Alburnoides
Fish described in 2015
Fish of Iran